Ferdinand the Bull is a 1938 American stand-alone animated short produced by Walt Disney Productions and released on November 25, 1938 by RKO Radio Pictures. It was directed by Dick Rickard and based on the 1936 book The Story of Ferdinand by Munro Leaf.  The music was by Albert Hay Malotte, most known for his setting of The Lord's Prayer, commonly sung at weddings.

It was remade in 2017 by Blue Sky Studios with John Cena as the titular bull.

Plot
The scene starts with many bulls, romping together and butting their heads, but Ferdinand is different; all he wants to do all day is go under a shady cork tree and smell the flowers. One day, his mother notices that he is not playing with the other bulls and asks him why. He responds, 'All I want to do is to sit and smell the flowers!' His mother is very understanding.

Ferdinand grows over the years, eventually getting to be the largest and strongest of the group. The other bulls grow up wanting to accomplish one goal in life; to be in the bullfights in Madrid, Spain, but not Ferdinand. One day, five strange-looking men show up to see the bulls. When the bulls notice them, they fight as rough as possible, hoping to get picked. Ferdinand doesn't engage and continues to smell the flowers. When he goes to sit, he doesn't realize there is a bumblebee right underneath him. The pain of the bee's sting makes him go on a crazy rampage, knock the other bulls out, and eventually tear down a tree. The five men cheer as they take Ferdinand to Madrid.

There is a lot of excitement when the day of the bullfight comes. On posters, they call him Ferdinand the Fierce. The event starts and out into the ring comes banderilleros, picadors and the matador who is being cheered on. As the matador bows, a woman in the audience throws him a bouquet of flowers which land in his hand. Finally, the moment comes where Ferdinand comes out and he wonders what is he doing there. The banderilleros and picadors are afraid and hide, but the matador gets scared stiff because Ferdinand is so big and strong. Ferdinand looks and sees the bouquet of flowers, walking over and scaring the matador away, but just starts smelling them. The matador becomes very angry at Ferdinand for not charging at him. But Ferdinand is not interested in fighting; he is only interested in smelling the beautiful flowers. Eventually, he is led out of the arena and taken back home where he continues to sit under the cork tree and smell the flowers.

Cast
 Don Wilson as Narrator
 Walt Disney as Ferdinand's Mother
 Milt Kahl as Ferdinand

Animators
 Milt Kahl
 Hamilton Luske
 Bill Stokes
 John Bradbury
 Bernard Garbutt
 Ward Kimball
 Jack Campbell
 Stan Quackenbush
 Don Lusk

Reception
The short film is broadcast in several countries every year on Christmas Eve as a part of the annual Disney Christmas show From All of Us to All of You. The Christmas show is especially popular in Sweden where it has aired since 1959 and has become a Christmas tradition. The replacement of Ferdinand the Bull with The Ugly Duckling in 1982 resulted in public outcry. The next year, in 1983, the change was reverted and Ferdinand the Bull returned to Swedish television.

Ferdinand the Bull won the 1938 Oscar for Best Short Subject (Cartoons). It won against shorts such as the Silly Symphonies short, Mother Goose Goes Hollywood.

Home media
The short was released on December 6, 2005 on Walt Disney Treasures: Disney Rarities - Celebrated Shorts: 1920s–1960s.

Additional releases include:
 Walt Disney Cartoon Classics Limited Gold Edition II: How the Best Was Won (1933–1960) (VHS/Betamax/Laserdisc), 1985
 Walt Disney Mini-Classics: Willie the Operatic Whale (VHS), 1991
 Walt Disney's Timeless Tales Volume 2: The Ugly Duckling/Wind in the Willows/The Country Cousin (DVD), 2005
 Walt Disney Animation Collection: Classic Short Films Volume 6: The Reluctant Dragon (DVD), 2009

References

External links

 
 

1938 short films
1938 films
1938 animated films
1930s color films
Best Animated Short Academy Award winners
Bullfighting films
1930s Disney animated short films
Animated films based on children's books
Films directed by Dick Rickard
Films produced by Walt Disney
Films set in Madrid
Films set in Spain
The Story of Ferdinand
American animated short films
1930s American films